Een danstragedie  is a 1916 Dutch silent film directed by Johan Gildemeijer.

Cast
 Adelqui Migliar - Mario
 Meina Irwen - Mario's vrouw / Mario's wife
 Piety Wigman - Hun dochter / Their daughter
 Jo Wigman - Hun dochter / Their daughter
 Christine Poolman - Mario's moeder / Mario's mother
 Louis Gimberg - Gentleman
 Caroline van Dommelen - Barones / Baroness

External links 
 

Dutch silent feature films
1916 films
Dutch black-and-white films